Kokomo Courthouse Square Historic District is a national historic district located at Kokomo, Howard County, Indiana.   The district includes 60 contributing buildings, 1 contributing structure, and 1 contributing object in the central business district of Kokomo. It developed between about 1870 and 1937 and includes notable examples of Italianate, Queen Anne, and Romanesque Revival style architecture. Notable buildings include the Draper Block (1904), Wilson Block (c. 1895), College Building (1909), Howard County Courthouse (1937), and a Railroad Watchman Tower (c. 1940).

It was listed on the National Register of Historic Places in 2008.

References

Kokomo, Indiana
County courthouses in Indiana
Historic districts on the National Register of Historic Places in Indiana
Courthouses on the National Register of Historic Places in Indiana
Italianate architecture in Indiana
Queen Anne architecture in Indiana
Romanesque Revival architecture in Indiana
Government buildings completed in 1886
Historic districts in Howard County, Indiana
National Register of Historic Places in Howard County, Indiana
1886 establishments in Indiana